Per Stavem (1 March 1926 – 24 September 2006) was a Norwegian shot putter and discus thrower. He represented Stabæk IF.

Biography
At the 1948 Summer Olympics he competed in the decathlon and finished eleventh with 6151 points. At the 1952 Summer Olympics he finished eighth in the shot final with 16.02 metres and sixteenth in discus throw with 46.00 metres. He became Norwegian champion in shot put in 1951 and 1952.

His personal best discus throw was 47.49 metres, achieved in September 1951 in Helsinki. A year later, on the same field, he set a career best in shot put with 16.02 metres.

References

1926 births
2006 deaths
Norwegian male discus throwers
Norwegian male shot putters
Athletes (track and field) at the 1948 Summer Olympics
Athletes (track and field) at the 1952 Summer Olympics
Olympic athletes of Norway